Founded in 1954, Ramakrishna Mission Shilpamandira is a self-supporting polytechnic in West Bengal's Belur Math, Bally, and Howrah districts. This polytechnic is accredited by AICTE, New Delhi, and connected with the West Bengal State Council of Technical Education. The mechanical, civil, electrical, electronic, and communications engineering diploma programmes at this polytechnic are available.

External links
 Admission to Polytechnics in West Bengal for Academic Session 2006–2007

References

Universities and colleges in Howrah district
Educational institutions established in 1954
1954 establishments in West Bengal
Technical universities and colleges in West Bengal